The Catalan Film Academy (Acadèmia del Cinema Català, in Catalan) is a non-profit organization located in Barcelona created to recognize Catalan film productions and professionals, with the objective of being a voice of the Catalan film industry. The Academy joins both creative and productive branches of filmmaking, artistically and scientifically, in the same way as the other film academies. It is a member of the European Film Academy's network of national film academies.

It annually holds the Gaudí Awards.

Presidents of the Academy
 Joel Joan i Juvé (2008–2013)
 Isona Passola i Vidal (since 2013)

References 

Cinema of Catalonia
Film organisations in Spain
Gaudí Awards